The Gesta crucigerorum Rhenanorum ('Deeds of the Rhineland Crusaders') is an anonymous Latin eyewitness account of the Fifth Crusade written by a cleric from Neuss who travelled with a fleet from the Rhineland. It covers the period 1217–1219 and was written shortly after the capture of Damietta. It ends with the return of the Rhenish crusaders and does not describe the disastrous end of the crusade.

The text is divided into seven sections. There is an English translation of the first part covering the siege of Alcácer do Sal. Georg Waitz suggested that the Gesta was written by the same Goswin who wrote the Carmen de expugnatione Salaciae, a poem about the siege of Alcácer. Unlike the Carmen, the Gesta does not report any miracles in connection with the capture of Alcácer. The Gesta is especially valuable for its report that at the time of the decision to attack Alcácer in the summer of 1217, it was known among the crusaders that King Frederick II of Germany would not be departing on crusade that year.

The Gesta was used as a source by Caesarius of Heisterbach and was incorporated with some modifications into the third continuation of the Chronica regia Coloniensis. There are two manuscript copies of the Gesta:

London, British Library, Burney 351, folios 223–227 (13th century)
Leiden, Universitaire Bibliotheken, VLF 95, folios 2–5 (15th century)

Notes

Bibliography

1219 works
Medieval Latin historical texts
Texts about the Crusades
Fifth Crusade